Sadyr Nurgojoyevich Japarov (sometimes Zhaparov) (born 6 December 1968) is a Kyrgyz politician who has served as the president of Kyrgyzstan since 28 January 2021. He had previously served as the acting prime minister of Kyrgyzstan in the 2020 interim government following the resignation of Sooronbay Jeenbekov on 15 October 2020 amidst electoral protests. Japarov also became acting president of Kyrgyzstan after Jeenbekov's resignation but resigned himself on 14 November 2020. On 10 January 2021, Japarov was elected president.

Early life and education 
Japarov was born in Keng-Suu, a village in the Tüp District in what was then the Kirghiz SSR within the Soviet Union, in the family of Nurgozho and Kadic Japarov. After finishing his middle school education in 1986, he joined the Kyrgyz National Academy of Physical Culture and Sport. In 1987, Japarov was drafted into the Soviet Army, where he served for two years in Novosibirsk as a commander in a telecommunications division. After returning in 1989 with the rank of Junior Sergeant, Japarov continued his education in the academy until 1991. In 2006, Japarov graduated from the Kyrgyz-Russian Slavic University in Bishkek with a degree in law.

Early political career 
Japarov started his political career after the 2005 Tulip Revolution. In March 2005, he was elected as member of the Supreme Council from the Tüp electoral district where he headed the Kelechek parliamentary faction. He was a supporter of President Kurmanbek Bakiyev. In 2006, Japarov was a member of the State Awards Commission. In 2007, he was Deputy Chairman of the Amnesty Commission.

In the 2007 parliamentary elections, he participated in the lists of the pro-presidential party Ak Jol, which won the majority of seats in parliament but went on to work as an adviser to the president. From 2008 to 2010, Japarov worked as an authorized representative of the National Agency for the Prevention of Corruption.

In 2010, President Bakiyev was overthrown in the Kyrgyz Revolution of 2010. As a result of interethnic clashes that took place soon in Osh and Jalal-Abad, Japarov and his associates took an active part, which according to their own statements, they tried to prevent clashes. However they were accused by opponents in supporting the Kyrgyz nationalists.

In the October 2010 elections, he was re-elected as a member of Supreme Council on the party list of Ata-Zhurt which led by Kamchybek Tashiev, which won the majority of seats. From there, he became the chairman of the Committee on Judicial and Legal issues.

Exile and imprisonment 
During one of the rallies for the nationalization of the Kumtor Gold Mine in the fall of 2012, the protesters attempted to take over the White House in Bishkek. Tashiev and Japarov were both charged under Article 295 of the Criminal Code of the Kyrgyz Republic "Forcible seizure of power or forcible retention of power." In March 2013, the Pervomaisky District Court of Bishkek found them guilty and sentenced them to one year and six months in prison. But in June 2013, the Bishkek City Court acquitted the politicians and released them in the courtroom.

On 27 June 2013, during the protests against Kumtor in Karakol, the protesters tried to kidnap the akim of the region Emilbek Kaptagaev and take him hostage. The Kyrgyz authorities accused Japarov and Kubanychbek Kadyrov of organizing the plan. The protest leaders were detained, but Japarov, who denied his involvement, fled Kyrgyzstan where he lived for some time in Cyprus.

In 2017, Japarov attempted to return to Kyrgyzstan. On 25 March 2017, he was detained at the Kyrgyz-Kazakh border. In the case of allegedly attempting to kidnap Emilbek Kaptagaev, he was sentenced to 11 years and 6 months in prison. While in prison, Japarov founded the political party Mekenchil with Kamchybek Tashiyev. Between 2018 and 2019, the party and its supporters grew and organized protests against Japarov's imprisonment.

Popularity in media and social media 
Much of Japarov's success is due to his strong social media campaigning, which has expanded in scale after his election to the president. Japarov told Kommersant in January 2021 that from 2017 to 2020, he created a power base from within prison by forming social media groups on Odnoklassniki, Facebook, Instagram, and WhatsApp. When questioned how he accomplished it from behind bars, he said, "According to the law, it is impossible, but we found a way out." However, his three years of illicit social media outreach did not appear to have spread extensively among the Kyrgyz people, since none of the respondents reported hearing of him during this period.

Interim leadership of Kyrgyzstan 

On 5 October 2020, protests and demonstrations against the results of the parliamentary elections began throughout Kyrgyzstan.

After the release of Japarov from a seized government building on 6 October, he was taken to Ala-Too Square in Bishkek where he sought appointment to become prime minister. Members of parliament staying at the Dostuk Hotel approved his appointment that night, but the opposition's nominee, Tilek Toktogaziev, declared himself to be the legitimate head of government. Toktogaziev asserted the election to be illegal, claiming that members were pressured by Japarov's supporters who had gathered near the hotel. Opponents of Japarov also highlighted the absence of a quorum and a violation of parliamentary procedure.

On 13 October, then-President Sooronbay Jeenbekov rejected Japarov's appointment as prime minister due to proxy voting occurring. Jeenbekov requested for the parliament to reconvene and vote again for the nomination; this happened the following day, with Japarov again winning parliamentary nomination. Japarov successfully was approved as prime minister by Jeenbekov, but he was initially unsuccessful in persuading the president to step down until a new general election could be held.

The following day, on 15 October, Jeenbekov resigned from the presidency, leading Japarov to declare himself as acting president. Despite the Kyrgyzstan Constitution stating that the speaker of the Supreme Council should succeed to the office, Kanatbek Isaev refused to assume office, resulting in Japarov becoming the acting president. He was confirmed as president of Kyrgyzstan by parliament on 16 October 2020.

President of Kyrgyzstan (2021–present)

Other 
Japarov's first five executive orders were related to spiritual development, a new personnel policy, business protection, migration, and mining. On 11 February, Japarov signed a decree on the celebration of the 120th anniversary of the birth of political figure Zhusup Abdrakhmanov.

Kumtor Gold Mine 
Since 2012, Japarov has advocated the nationalization of the Kumtor gold mine located in his native Issyk-Kul Region, and accused the management company, Centerra Gold, of environmental violations and corruption. His stance has earned him popularity among his fellow natives of the region.

On 14 May 2021, he signed into a bill allowing for temporary government control over the mine, eight days after it was approved by parliament. In response, Centerra Gold launched arbitration against Kyrgyzstan over the mine.

Foreign policy 

Sadyr Japarov has emphasized his administration will have a "multipronged" foreign policy, with Russia, Kazakhstan, and Uzbekistan being major partners under his leadership.

Sadyr Japarov has adopted a pro-Russia stance. His first plan for a trip to a foreign country while in office was to Russia on 25–26 February 2021.

Sadyr Japarov has suggested Kyrgyzstan pay off debt to China with mineral concessions.

On 2–3 March 2021, Japarov visited Nur-Sultan, where he held consultations with Kazakhstan President Kassym-Jomart Tokayev and former president Nursultan Nazarbayev. Japarov secured a protocol aimed to ensure energy security of Kyrgyzstan by preventing Toktogul Reservoir from running out of water to a critical level. During the visit, Japarov said that "there are no political contradictions between our countries" and that "We have many common interests". He visited Tashkent a week later, where he and Uzbek President Shavkat Mirziyoev agreed to solve all border issues in three months.

During the 2021 Kyrgyzstan–Tajikistan conflict, he led the Kyrgyz response to the clashes. On 30 April, he held a telephone conversation with the President of Tajikistan Emomali Rahmon, during which he agreed to participate in a face-to-face meeting in Dushanbe in the second half of May. He also proposed the creation of a peacekeeping commission composed of elders from both countries. Later that day, Japarov addressed the Kyrgyz people, where he called for calm particularly from youth, underlining that the Tajik leadership don't want a war with Kyrgyzstan, noting their experience in the Tajik Civil War. At the same time, he also accused "certain forces" of destabilizing the situation on the border. He declared 1 and 2 May as a period of nationwide mourning.

In June 2021, Sadyr Japarov and his Turkmen counterpart Gurbanguly Berdymukhamedov met to discuss the possibility of Turkmenistan supplying Kyrgyzstan with natural gas and electricity in the autumn and winter. At the time, Kyrgyzstan authorities had plans to convert the Bishkek coal-burning power plant to gas. On 17 June, Ulukbek Maripov, head of the Kyrgyz cabinet, stated his view that gas was too costly.

Criticism 
Japarov has been described as a nationalist and a populist. Among Western media, he has been compared to politicians like Ilham Aliyev and Donald Trump.

Japarov is accused of adherence to Kyrgyz nationalism, with many labelling him as "a staunch nationalist inclined to violence", and an anti-Uzbek. Many allege that during the time of Japarov's work in anti-corruption departments, he "did not show significant success in the fight against corruption", being accused of having connections with a "thief in law" and northern crime boss, Kamchy Kolbaev.

In April 2021, Japarov promoted toxic Aconitum root as a treatment for COVID-19. Subsequently, at least four people were admitted to hospital suffering from poisoning. Facebook had previously removed the President's posts advocating use of the substance, saying "We've removed this post as we do not allow anyone, including elected officials, to share misinformation that could lead to imminent physical harm or spread false claims about how to cure or prevent COVID-19".

Personal life 
Japarov is married to Aigul Japarova (née Asanbaeva), who is five years his junior. She was born in the neighboring village to Japarov's in the Tüp District. During his acting presidency, she volunteered to help volunteers in the fight against the COVID-19 pandemic. He is also the father of four children, with his eldest son Dastan having died on 26 August 2019 in an accident. His father and mother died in September 2017 and March 2019, respectively, during his prosecution and prison term. In neither case was Japarov allowed by the State Penitentiary Service to attend the funeral. It is known that one of his brothers owns one of the coal mines in the north of the country.

Awards and honorifics 

 Badge "Excellent Worker of the Soviet Army"
 In 2009, he was awarded the medal of the Issyk-Kul Regional State Administration "for merits and significant contribution to the socio-economic development of the Issyk-Kul region."
 In 2010, he was awarded the Medal "For Merit" of the Russian Union of Afghanistan Veterans

He also holds the following titles:

Honorary President of the Mixed Martial Arts Federation of Kyrgyzstan

Notes

References

1968 births
Living people
Presidents of Kyrgyzstan
Prime Ministers of Kyrgyzstan
People from Issyk-Kul Region
Kyrgyzstani politicians
Kyrgyzstani Muslims